Path integral molecular dynamics (PIMD) is a method of incorporating quantum mechanics into molecular dynamics simulations using Feynman path integrals. In PIMD, one uses the Born–Oppenheimer approximation to separate the wavefunction into a nuclear part and an electronic part. The nuclei are treated quantum mechanically by mapping each quantum nucleus onto a classical system of several fictitious particles connected by springs (harmonic potentials) governed by an effective Hamiltonian, which is derived from Feynman's path integral. The resulting classical system, although complex, can be solved relatively quickly. There are now a number of commonly used condensed matter computer simulation techniques that make use of the path integral formulation including Centroid Molecular Dynamics (CMD), Ring Polymer Molecular Dynamics (RPMD), and the Feynman-Kleinert Quasi-Classical Wigner (FK-QCW) method. The same techniques are also used in path integral Monte Carlo (PIMC).

Combination with other simulation techniques

Applications 

The technique has been used to calculate time correlation functions.

References

Further reading

External links 
 
 

Molecular dynamics
Quantum chemistry
Quantum Monte Carlo